Melanochaeta  may refer to:
 Melanochaeta (fly), a genus of fly in the family Chloropidae
 Melanochaeta (fungus), a genus of fungi in the family Chaetosphaeriaceae